Marco Visconti is a 1941 Italian historical drama film directed by Mario Bonnard and starring Carlo Ninchi, Roberto Villa and Mariella Lotti. It is based on the novel of the same name by Tommaso Grossi which had previously been made into a 1925 silent film.

It was shot at the Cinecittà Studios in Rome. The film's sets were designed by the art directors Piero Filippone and Vittorio Nino Novarese.

Main cast
 Carlo Ninchi as Marco Visconti 
 Roberto Villa as Ottorino Visconti 
 Mariella Lotti as Bice Del Balzo 
 Alberto Capozzi as Lodrisio Visconti 
 Guglielmo Barnabò as Oldrado Del Balzo 
 Ernesto Almirante as Tremacoldo 
 Alfredo De Antoni as Il conte Rusconi 
 Mario Gallina as Pelagrua 
 Augusto Di Giovanni as Lupo 
 Nini Dinelli as Lauretta

References

Bibliography 
 Goble, Alan. The Complete Index to Literary Sources in Film. Walter de Gruyter, 1999.

External links 
 

1941 films
1940s historical drama films
Italian historical drama films
Italian black-and-white films
1940s Italian-language films
Films directed by Mario Bonnard
Films shot at Cinecittà Studios
Films set in the 14th century
1941 drama films
1940s Italian films